Totally Hits 2003 is an album in the Totally Hits series. The album contains the number-one Billboard Hot 100 single, "This Is the Night" by Clay Aiken.

Track listing
Kelly Clarkson - "Miss Independent" 3:33
Michelle Branch - "Are You Happy Now?" 3:47
Santana featuring Alex Band of The Calling - "Why Don't You & I" 3:45
Fabolous featuring Tamia - "Into You" 4:18
R. Kelly featuring Cam'ron and Big Tigger - "Snake (Remix)" 4:26
Monica - "So Gone" 3:21
Jason Mraz - "The Remedy (I Won't Worry)" 4:10
Jewel - "Intuition" 3:48
Clay Aiken - "This Is the Night" 3:32
Ruben Studdard - "Flying Without Wings" 3:42
Justin Timberlake - "Cry Me a River" 4:48
Sean Paul - "Like Glue" 3:51
Simple Plan - "Addicted" 3:52
Avril Lavigne - "Sk8er Boi" 3:23
Trapt - "Headstrong" 3:54
Uncle Kracker - "In a Little While" 4:04
Christina Aguilera - "Fighter" 4:07
Missy Elliott - "Work It" 4:22
Blu Cantrell featuring Sean Paul - "Breathe" 3:48
Luther Vandross - "Dance with My Father" 4:19

Certifications

References

Totally Hits
2003 compilation albums